The 1941 Florida Gators football team was an American football team that represented the University of Florida in the Southeastern Conference (SEC) during the 1941 college football season. In their second season under head coach Tom Lieb, the Gators compiled a 4–6 record (1–3 against SEC opponents) and outscored opponents by a total of 149 to 97. The team played its home games at Florida Field in Gainesville, Florida. The season's highlights included a 14–0 road win over the Miami Hurricanes and a 14–7 homecoming victory over Georgia Tech.

Three Florida players were recognized by the Associated Press (AP) or United Press (UP) on the 1941 All-SEC football team: Fergie Ferguson (AP-2, UP-1); tackle Milton Hull (AP-3); and halfback Tommy Harrison (AP-3).
Ferguson was the Gators' second-ever first-team All-SEC selection. He also received an honorable mention All-American by Grantland Rice in Collier's magazine. He led the team in both points scored (36) and minutes played (420).

Schedule

References

Florida
Florida Gators football seasons
Florida Gators football